College Mound is an unincorporated community in Kaufman County, located in the U.S. state of Texas. According to the Handbook of Texas, the community had a population of 350 in 2000. It is located within the Dallas/Fort Worth Metroplex.

History
College Mound was established as one of the first communities in Kaufman County and was first settled by people from Indiana and Tennessee in the mid-1840s. It had several stores, a cotton gin, and a church sometime after. A Methodist church was erected in 1845 and had a cemetery that next year. A permanent church site was deeded on land given by W.T. Patton in 1866 and was built in 1897. The building hosted five different religious denominations: Methodist, Presbyterian, Christian, Missionary Baptist, and Primitive Baptist. One report says that two bartenders from Elmo attempted to disrupt some church services in College Mound by heckling the pastor. An Abraham Lincoln doppelganger took one of the two outside and beat him, causing them to flee and never return. A post office was established at College Mound in 1850 and remained in operation until 1874, with an interruption during the American Civil War. John L. Beck served as the postmaster. The church remained a focal point of the community in the 1980s, with many of its members being descendants of the original settlers. It had several scattered houses, the church, and a cemetery during that time. Its population was 350 in 2000.

Geography

Education
There were plans to build a college in the community, but it was never carried out. College Mound soon had its own school that joined the Terrell Independent School District in 1949.

Notable person
 William Madison McDonald, politician, businessman, and banker, was born in College Mound.

References

Unincorporated communities in Kaufman County, Texas
Unincorporated communities in Texas